Tysons (also known by its former official name Tysons Corner), a census-designated place (CDP) and unincorporated community in Fairfax County, Virginia, contains at least 18 high-rise buildings that stand  or taller. Capital One Tower is currently the tallest building. VITA Tysons Corner had previously held the record since 2015.

History
Development by the military and intelligence sectors in Tysons began in 1952 with the construction of a  microwave transmission tower, known as the Tysons Corner Communications Tower, by the United States Army. Built upon the highest elevation in Fairfax County, the tower relayed microwave transmissions between Washington, D.C. and government facilities near the Blue Ridge Mountains to enable emergency continuity of government. Tysons itself was a rural crossroads community until 1961, when the Central Intelligence Agency completed its headquarters in nearby Langley. This spurred defense contractors to setup offices in Tysons. In 1962, real estate developer WestGroup received county approval to build its WestGate and WestPark office parks in Tysons which were among the first in the area. That same year, the county also approved plans for Lerner Enterprises to build the Tysons Corner Center shopping mall, which subsequently opened in 1968.

By the mid-1980s, the Fairfax County supervisors approved an easing of the county's  height limit to allow for the construction of the never-built  Tysons Tower office building at the intersection of the Capital Beltway and Virginia Route 7. County officials sought to make Tysons into Fairfax County's "new downtown."

In June 2010, the Fairfax County supervisors authorized a plan to transform Tysons from an automobile-dependent suburb into a "walkable city." By 2011, Tysons had  of office space; higher than the metropolitan areas of San Antonio, Texas and Jacksonville, Florida. Increased high-rise construction in Tysons was further spurred by the construction and opening of the Silver Line of the Washington Metro, which has four stations in Tysons: Spring Hill, Greensboro, Tysons Corner, and McLean.

Tysons is home to the corporate headquarters of five Fortune 500 companies: Freddie Mac, Capital One, Hilton Worldwide, Booz Allen Hamilton, and Gannett Company.

Tallest buildings

Tallest buildings under construction or proposed

Under construction
The following buildings under construction in Tysons are expected to rise at least .

Proposed
There are numerous buildings proposed in Tysons that are expected to rise at least .

Timeline of tallest buildings

See also
 List of tallest buildings in Virginia
 List of tallest buildings in Washington, D.C.

References
Explanatory notes
a.  The United States Census Bureau officially began referring to the census-designated place of Tysons Corner as Tysons in Summer 2016. The name Tysons was first unofficially adopted in 2012 by the Tysons Partnership, a nonprofit association of area businesses and stakeholders.

b.  An asterisk (*) indicates that the building is still under construction, but has been topped out.

Citations

Further reading

External links 
 
 Tysons Development Activity

Buildings and structures in Fairfax County, Virginia
Tallest in Tysons
Tysons
Skyscrapers in Virginia
Tysons, Virginia